The Prince of Homburg is a 1997 Italian drama film directed by Marco Bellocchio, based on the play Der Prinz von Homburg by Heinrich von Kleist. It was entered into the 1997 Cannes Film Festival.

Cast
 Andrea Di Stefano as Prince of Homburg
 Barbora Bobuľová as Natalia
 Toni Bertorelli as Elector
 Anita Laurenzi as Electoress
 Fabio Camilli as Hohenzollern
 Gianluigi Fogacci
 Italo Dall'Orto
 Bruno Corazzari as Kottwitz
 Diego Ribon
 Pierfrancesco Favino as Sparren
 Federico Scribani as Capt. Stranz (as Federico Scribani Rossi)

See also
List of historical drama films

References

External links

1997 films
1997 drama films
Italian drama films
1990s Italian-language films
Italian films based on plays
Films based on works by Heinrich von Kleist
Films directed by Marco Bellocchio
Films set in Prussia
Films set in the 1670s
1990s Italian films